Mystic Fire is the seventh studio album by American hard rock band Mountain, released in 2002. It is their final album of original material, as their following album, Masters of War, would consist solely of covers.

The album includes the song "Immortal", which was co-written with and originally performed by Clutch. "Immortal" was originally released with different lyrics, and a different arrangement, as the song "Baby I'm Down" on Mountain (1969), Leslie West's first solo album. Clutch covered the song on their 2001 album Pure Rock Fury, rearranging it and changing the lyrics; their version has a guitar solo by Leslie West. Mountain then covered that version of the song on this album.

Reception

Allmusic questioned the legitimacy of crediting the album to Mountain, arguing that ever since the death of Felix Pappalardi, compounded by the absence of Steve Knight, Mountain had been no more than a Leslie West solo project under a more marketable name, albeit with significant contributions from Corky Laing. They further criticized that "The songs are often rudimentary compositions that serve as excuses for the guitar excursions; they lack the poetic lyrics formerly contributed by [Gail] Collins and Pete Brown."

Track listing
 "Immortal" (Leslie West, Neil Fallon) - 3:59
 "Mystic Fire" (Corky Laing, Leslie West) - 4:44
 "Fever" (Eddie Cooley, John Davenport) - 3:22
 "The Sea" (George Citron, Leslie West) - 5:19
 "Mutant X" (Corky Laing, Leslie West) - 5:17
 "Better Off with the Blues" (Delbert McClinton, Gary Nicholson) - 4:15
 "Mountain Express (Oh Boy)" (Leslie West) - 2:56
 "Marble Peach / Rotten Peach" (Corky Laing, Leslie West) - 5:01
 "Johnny Comes Marching Home" (Traditional) - 2:50
 "Nantucket Sleighride (Redux)" (Felix Pappalardi, Gail Collins) - 7:29

Personnel
 Leslie West – guitar, vocals, arranger, producer
 Corky Laing – drums, vocals, string arrangements & conductor

with:
 Chuck Hearne – bass
 Ritchie Scarlett - bass on "Nantucket Sleighride (Redux)"
 Todd Wolfe – slide guitar on "Fever"

Additional personnel
 Arnie Holland – executive producer
 Lisa Walker – art direction

References

External links 
 Mountain - Mystic Fire (2002) album review by William Ruhlmann, credits & releases at AllMusic.com
 Mountain - Mystic Fire (2002) album releases & credits at Discogs.com
 Mountain - Mystic Fire (2002) album to be listened as stream at Play.Spotify.com

2002 albums
Mountain (band) albums